, or Earth, is a 1939 Japanese film directed by Tomu Uchida, based on the classic 1912 Meiji era novel Tsuchi by poet Takashi Nagatsuka, translated into English as The Soil by historian Ann Waswo. The film won the 1940 Kinema Junpo Award for Best Film.

A seriously compromised print of Earth was discovered in Germany in 1968. It suffers from nitrate damage and includes German subtitles. It is missing its first and last reel. The original film was 142 minutes long; this version runs 93 minutes. A 119-minute version of the film, with subtitles in Russian, was discovered in Russia around the turn of the millennium. It, too, is missing the last reel.

Plot 
The plot of Tsuchi focuses on a family of farmers who are down on their luck, but also extensively depicts the rural community's milieu, daily work and way of life. Kanji (Isamu Kosugi) is embittered because he has to pay off the debts of his dead wife's father (Kaichi Yamamoto). He is also overly protective of his daughter, Otsugi (Akiko Kazami), which severely restricts her interaction with the community.

Development 
Director Tomu Uchida's original plan to film Nagatsuka's famous novel was turned down by Nikkatsu, the studio to which he was under contract. While Uchida was working on other projects for the studio, he began filming Tsuchi on weekends without authorization. This secret filming included on-location shooting in Japan. Once Nikkatsu caught wind of what was happening it was too late; the production was too far along for the studio to halt it. The management feared losing face with its workers, who had already put in a lot of time making the film, so Nikkatsu decided to complete the film and released it to the public to unexpected commercial success.

Reception 
The Japanese filmmaker Akira Kurosawa cited this movie as one of his 100 favorite films.

References 

1930s Japanese-language films
Films directed by Tomu Uchida
Best Film Kinema Junpo Award winners
1939 films
Nikkatsu films
Japanese drama films
1939 drama films
Japanese black-and-white films